Kënga Magjike 06 took place in the 1 Tetori Auditorium in Pristina, Kosovo.There were two semifinals (21 & 22 January 2005) and a final (23 January 2005). 30 songs competed for the win but only 1 won the show, while others were awarded different prizes. In the end, Irma Libohova won the first prize, making this her second victory. Yllka Kuqi was the runner-up. The winner was determined by the singers who voted for each other.

The results

Voting Procedure 

The singers voted for each other to determine the ranking of the songs, while the jury decided most of the other prizes. Televoting was used for the "Public's Prize".

The Jury 

 President of the Jury, Singer: Nexhmije Pagarusha
 Singer, Songwriter: Aleksandër Gjoka
 Singer, Composer: Valton Beqiri
 Violinist: Ibrahim Madhi
 Beauty Pageant, Hosts, Producer: Valbona Selimllari
 General Director of TV Klan: Aleksandër Frangaj

Other Prizes

Orchestra 

Playback was used.

Guest Artists 

 Merita Halili
 Samantha Fox
 Rednex
 Ai-kut
 Albi Nako & Dance Crew
 Xeni
 Orinda Huta

Staff 

 Organizer: Ardit Gjebrea
 Director: Vera Grabocka

Sources 

 KM Official Website: http://www.kengamagjike.com
 RTV Klan: http://rtvklan.com/mat.php?idm=74

2005
2005 in Albania